Mario González (born 27 January 1971) is a Mexican judoka. He competed in the men's lightweight event at the 1992 Summer Olympics.

References

1971 births
Living people
Mexican male judoka
Olympic judoka of Mexico
Judoka at the 1992 Summer Olympics
Place of birth missing (living people)
Pan American Games medalists in judo
Pan American Games gold medalists for Mexico
Judoka at the 1991 Pan American Games
Medalists at the 1991 Pan American Games
21st-century Mexican people
20th-century Mexican people